William Strange may refer to:
William Strange, who gave name to Strange Creek, West Virginia
William Alder Strange (1813–1874), English headmaster and author
Billy Strange (William Everett Strange, 1930–2012), American musician and actor
William Strange (priest) (born 1953), Anglican clergyman
William Heath Strange, founded the Hampstead General Hospital

See also 
Frederick William Strange (1844–1897), English-born Canadian physician and politician
Maxwell W. Strange (Maxwell William Strange, 1820–1880), Canadian politician
Wayde Preston (William Erksine Strange, 1929–1992), American actor
William Strang (disambiguation)